Mount Jerusalem  is a national park in New South Wales, Australia, 635 km north of Sydney. It contains three river systems, Tweed River, Brunswick River and the Richmond River. The park forms the outer rim of Tweed Caldera, a volcano that was active 21 million years ago.

Important Bird Area
The park lies within the Nightcap Range Important Bird Area, so identified by BirdLife International because it contains the largest known population of Albert's lyrebirds, as well as several other significant bird species.

See also
 Protected areas of New South Wales
 Byron Bay, New South Wales
 High Conservation Value Old Growth forest

References

National parks of New South Wales
Protected areas established in 1995
1995 establishments in Australia
Important Bird Areas of New South Wales